Teachers are people who help students to acquire knowledge, competence or virtue.

Teachers may also refer to:

Arts, entertainment and media

Film and television
 Teachers (film), a 1984 American satirical comedy-drama 
 Teachers TV, a British TV channel and website 2005–2011
 Teachers (British TV series), a comedy-drama series 2001–2004
 Teachers (2006 TV series), an American version of the British series
 Teachers (2016 TV series), an American sitcom on TV Land based on a web series 
 "Teachers", an episode of New Girl (season 4)

Music
 "Teachers", a song by Leonard Cohen from the 1967 album Songs of Leonard Cohen
 "Teachers", a song by Daft Punk from the 1997 album Homework
 "Teachers", a song by P.O.D. from the 2006 album Testify

Other uses
 Teacher's Highland Cream, a blended Scotch whisky
 Teachers Building Society is a mutual British financial institution 
 Teachers RFC, a Bermudan rugby club

See also
 Educators (TV series) 
Ontario Teachers' Pension Plan, or Ontario Teachers'

Teacher (disambiguation)